Up the Creek is an American comedy web series created and written by vineyard owner Joe Taylor and funded by his own savings. The series is broadcast on the internet and premiered on Blip on March 28, 2012. So far, one season has been created, with season two in production. Up the creek is a comedy web series created by Joe Taylor who in real life owns the Sleepy Creek Vineyards, which is a small winery and vineyard located in Fairmount, Illinois, the Midwest region of the US. Up The Creek is about a small, financially struggling winery that has a dysfunctional staff. It reflects on the idea that with wine businesses, perceptions are usually very different from reality.

History 

Up the Creek was written by Joe Taylor, and the idea emerged when Joe Taylor and Bill Kephart (Rusty) were in the vineyard crushing and pressing grapes. Joe and Bill picked the winery setting because it served as a ready made set as they had no budget. Joe, Bill and Mike Trippiedi (Major Tom) are the main writers of the show, but all of the cast contribute. Joe Taylor calls Up the Creek a "Sipcom”, a shorter version of a traditional sitcom that is made funnier while watched drinking a glass of wine or beer. Joe's goal was to create a show that had a feel of classic sitcoms from the 1970s and 1980s.

Season 1 

Episode 1: Wiener Fire - Grant is given control of the winery. He soon learns that the winery is in serious financial trouble. 
Episode 2: What Goes Up -Wine critic Park Roberts is coming to visit the winery. 
Episode 3: Operation Sanitation - Antonio gets an unwanted visit from a winery consultant that sticks his nose where it doesn't belong. 
Episode 4: Corked - Branson has to deal with a "challenging" customer. 
Episode 5: Jingle, Jangle, Jingles - Famous Canadian Country Western singer, Peeve Stoltz, is going to put on a concert at Sleepy Creek 
Episode 6: Shotgun Wedding - An episode about love, tolerance, acceptance and beer.
Episode 7: The Drinking Dead - Major Tom and Rusty are seeing signs that the end is near.

References

External links 
 Up the Creek on Blip 
 Official Website

American comedy web series
2012 web series debuts